Rashan  (in Albanian) or Gornje Rašane (in Serbian; Горње Рашане) is a village in the municipality of Mitrovica in the District of Mitrovica, Kosovo. According to the 2011 census, it had 364 inhabitants, from whom 363 were Albanian.

Notes

References

Villages in Mitrovica, Kosovo